is a series of emulated arcade games from the late 1970s, 1980s, 1990s, and early 2000s for PlayStation 4, Xbox One, Microsoft Windows, and Nintendo Switch, published by Hamster Corporation. A sub-series called  is focused on rereleasing Neo Geo titles in their original arcade format, unlike many services with attempts to emulate the console versions. 

Arcade Archives was first released for the PlayStation 4 in May 2014. It also supports various system specific features, in which players can share screenshots and videos, and compete with others scores for online ranking. The Xbox One version of the service was launched in February 2017 for the Xbox Games Store, and only includes Neo Geo games. The Nintendo Switch version of the service was also launched on the Nintendo eShop in March 2017, initially focusing on Neo Geo games before the addition of other arcade games, including Nintendo's own games. The Windows 10 version of the service was launched in December 2017 for the Microsoft Store, and like the Xbox One version, this version only includes Neo Geo games. ACA Neo Geo games arrived on iOS (through App Store) and Android (through Google Play) starting from November 30, 2021.

Games
There are currently  games on the original Arcade Archives list and  games on the ACA Neo Geo list below.

ACA Neo Geo

Embedded compilations
These are the arcade game compilations that use the core emulators used on the Arcade Archives series, generally going under the Powered by Arcade Archives remark.

Release schedule
Currently  games on the Arcade Archives list have been announced for an upcoming release below. New releases (if any) are announced on Hamster's official Twitter page on the Wednesday before their scheduled releases on the following Thursday (Friday in the case of Nintendo's games). Namco's games are generally released every other week, with a new one announced two weeks in advance following the respective weekly release. Once a release date for a title has been announced, it will be moved to the Games list. Titles announced but not released within two years in advance will be removed from this list.

See also
 List of Nintendo Switch games
 List of Nintendo Switch Online games
 List of PlayStation 4 games
 List of Xbox One games
 Oretachi Gēsen Zoku
 Arcade Game Series
 Johnny Turbo's Arcade
 Sega Ages
 Virtual Console

References

Footnotes

Citations

External links
Official website

Arcade video games
Hamster Corporation franchises
SNK game compilations
Konami video game compilations
Square Enix video game compilations
Nintendo video game compilations
Bandai Namco video game compilations
Nintendo Switch games
PlayStation 4 games
PlayStation Network games
Xbox One games
Windows games
IOS games
Android (operating system) games
Video game compilations
Video games developed in Japan